Gustave Rheingans (September 8, 1890 – February 28, 1951) was an American politician and farmer.

Born in the Town of Eagle Point, Chippewa County, Wisconsin, Rheingans grew up on a farm. In 1920, he moved to Chippewa Falls, Wisconsin and worked for Farmers Produce Company and was in dairy and truck farming. He also worked as a clerk in a hardware store. Rheingans served in the Wisconsin State Assembly and was a Republican. He also served as sergeant at arms in the 1931, 1935, and 1937 Wisconsin Legislatures. Rheingans died in Chippewa Falls, Wisconsin.

Notes

1890 births
1951 deaths
People from Chippewa County, Wisconsin
Farmers from Wisconsin
Employees of the Wisconsin Legislature
20th-century American politicians
Republican Party members of the Wisconsin State Assembly